Julián García Valverde (born 1946) is a Spanish politician who served as Minister of Health and Consumer Affairs from March 1991 to January 1992.

References

1946 births
Living people
Complutense University of Madrid alumni
Government ministers of Spain
20th-century Spanish politicians
Health ministers of Spain